Charlotte Gray may refer to:

People
Charlotte Gray (author) (born 1948), Canadian historian and author
Charlotte A. Gray (1844-1912), English educator and temperance leader 
Charlotte E. Gray (1873–1926), American author

Other
Charlotte Gray (novel), a 1999 novel by Sebastian Faulks
Charlotte Gray (film), a 2001 film based on the novel